Orania sylvicola is a species of flowering plant in the family Arecaceae. It is found in southern Thailand, Indonesia, Malaysia, and Singapore.

References

sylvicola
Trees of Indo-China
Trees of Malesia
Near threatened plants
Plants described in 1845
Taxonomy articles created by Polbot